Layering is the process whereby the branch of a tree, or other plant, produces roots and is separated from the original plant, becoming a new, separate plant. Layering is utilized by horticulturists to propagate desirable plants.

Natural layering typically occurs when a branch touches the ground, whereupon it produces adventitious roots. At a later stage the connection with the parent plant is severed and a new plant is produced as a result.

The horticultural layering process typically involves wounding the target region to expose the inner stem and optionally applying rooting compounds.

In ground layering or simple layering, the stem is bent down and the target region is buried in the soil. This is done in plant nurseries in imitation of natural layering by many plants such as brambles which bow over and touch the tip on the ground, at which point it grows roots and, when separated, can continue as a separate plant. In either case, the rooting process may take from several weeks to a year.

There are two methods of air layering, which do not involve burying the stem. In ring air layering, the exposed wound is covered in a growth medium such as sphagnum moss, and wrapped in a material such as plastic. The roots grow into the medium and after a period of time, the stem is separated from the original plant. Tourniquet air layering has a similar method to air layering, except that instead of creating a wound, a wire is wrapped around the stem and the ends are twisted until it is very tight.

Layering is more complicated than taking cuttings, but has the advantage that the propagated portion continues to receive water and nutrients from the parent plant while it is forming roots.  This is important for plants that form roots slowly, or for propagating large pieces. Layering is used quite frequently in the propagation of bonsai; it is also used as a technique for both creating new roots and improving existing roots.

Method and process
A low-growing stem is bent down to touch a hole dug in the ground, then pinned in place using something shaped like a clothes hanger hook and covered over with soil.  However, a few inches of leafy growth must remain above the ground for the bent stem to grow into a new plant.  Removing a section of skin from the lower-facing stem part before burying may help the rooting process.  If using rooting hormone, the stem should be cut just beneath a node.  The resultant notch should be wedged open with a toothpick or similar piece of wood and the hormone applied before burying.

The buried stem part then grows new roots which take hold in the soil while the above parts grow as individual new plants.  Once the end of the stem has grown long enough the process can be repeated, creating the appearance of a row of plants linked by humped, intermittently buried stems.  Better results can be achieved when the top of the plant is closer to the vertical.

Once the process is completed, the buried section should be kept well-watered until roots begin to form.  The new individual plant may require one to two years before it is strong enough to survive on its own. When it is, the original stem should be cut where it enters the ground, thereby separating the two plants.

Plants types and benefit
As layering does not involve sexual reproduction, new plants are effectively clones of the original plant and will exhibit the same characteristics.  This includes flower, fruit and foliage.  Plant selection usually involves plants with a flexible stem.

Simple layering can be more attractive when managing a cascading or spreading plant.  These plants tend to propagate in this manner anyway, and potting a new limb will give extra plants without having to sow new seed.

Simple layering can also help when a plant has overgrown its pot and is drooping over the side.  The long stem is layered into another pot until it roots, thus bringing it back to soil level.

Ground layering
Ground layering or mound layering is the typical propagation technique for the popular Malling-Merton series of clonal apple root stocks, in which the original plants are set in the ground with the stem nearly horizontal, which forces side buds to grow upward. After these are started, the original stem is buried up to some distance from the tip. At the end of the growing season, the side branches will have rooted, and can be separated while the plant is dormant. Some of these will be used for grafting rootstocks, and some can be reused in the nursery for the next growing season's crop.

Ground layering is used in the formation of visible surface roots, known as "nebari", on bonsai trees.

Air layering

In air layering (or marcotting), the target region is wounded by an upward 4 cm long cut and held open with a toothpick or similar, or a strip of bark is removed. The wound is then surrounded with a lump of moisture-retaining medium such as sphagnum moss or cloth, and then further surrounded by a moisture barrier such as plastic film tied or taped to the branch to prevent moisture loss or ingress of too much water as from rain.  Rooting hormone is often applied to the wound to encourage root growth. When sufficient roots have grown from the wound, the stem is removed from the parent plant and planted, taking care to shield it from too much sun and to protect it from drying out until the new roots take hold. It can take the layer from a few weeks to one or more growing seasons to produce sufficient roots; this is largely dependent on the plant species and the vigor of the parent plant.

See also

Coppicing
Hedge laying
Cashew of Pirangi

References

External links

 Information and illustrated step-by-step instructions for air layering

Plant reproduction
Asexual reproduction
Horticulture
it:Propaggine